Distinguished Flying Cross Society (DFCS) was founded in 1994 nonprofit war veterans’ organization, located in San Diego, California. There are 32 chapters and 7000 members of the DFCS.

History
The Distinguished Flying Cross is America's highest award for aerial achievement. The award was authorized by United States Congress on July 2, 1926. 68 years after the inception of the DFC (1994) the Distinguished Flying Cross Society was started. Before the formation of DFCS there was no centralized documentation of the recipients of the DFC. the United States government kept no records on DFC recipients so there is no way to know how many received the medal.

The DFCS offers scholarships for descendants and adopted children of DFC Society members.

The society has 32 chapters all over the United States and those chapters schedule speaking engagements for Distinguished Flying Cross recipients.

On March 7, 2020, the Flying Cross Society dedicated a Memorial at Miramar National Cemetery in San Diego, California. The dedication too place on the birthday of 100 year old DFCS member and DFC recipient Air Force Brig. Gen. Robert L. Cardenas; he was on hand for the dedication. Seventy-five members of the DFCS attended the dedication.

Embezzling
In 2017 the Treasurer of the society pled guilty in Federal court to embezzling $124,000 from the Society. The Treasure named Anthony Ventura, was a Vietnam aviator and was also a recipient of the Distinguished Flying Cross. He falsified reports to cover his theft, and he filed false tax returns.

See also
Inter-service awards and decorations of the United States military

References

Further reading

1994 establishments in the United States
Non-profit organizations based in San Diego
United States military support organizations
United States Navy support organizations
Organizations established in 1994